Shannon Archer (born 29 July 1998 in Edinburgh) is a Scottish gymnast. She competed at the 2022 Commonwealth Games and won a bronze medal in Women's vault. She was Scottish all-around champion.

She competed at the 2018 Commonwealth Games.

She trains with South Essex Gymnastics Club.

References 

Living people
1998 births
Scottish gymnasts
British female artistic gymnasts
Gymnasts at the 2018 Commonwealth Games
Gymnasts at the 2022 Commonwealth Games
Commonwealth Games bronze medallists for Scotland
Commonwealth Games medallists in gymnastics
Commonwealth Games competitors for Scotland
Sportspeople from Edinburgh
21st-century British women
Medallists at the 2022 Commonwealth Games